The Aeronauts was a French children's TV series about two fighter jet pilots in French Air Force, Michel Tanguy (Jacques Santi) and Ernest Laverdure (Christian Marin) and their adventures. It was based on a comic book series by Jean-Michel Charlier and Albert Uderzo titled Tanguy et Laverdure. The fighter aircraft featured were the Dassault Mystère IV and  Dassault Mirage III.

Made by French production company Office de Radiodiffusion Télévision Française (ORTF) between 1967 and 1970, its original French title was Les chevaliers du ciel ("The Knights of the Sky").

The three seasons were originally filmed in colour but the first season was broadcast on French TV from September 1967 in black and white, as French television was only in black and white at the time. All three seasons were later released in colour when the series appeared in a 6-DVD box in the early 2000s. This 6-DVD set is now sold out and used copies fetch high prices.

It was dubbed into English, retitled The Aeronauts and shown by the BBC on UK children's TV, and in Canada on the CBC, in the early 1970s. In 1972 Rick Jones released a single of the anglicised theme tune. In 1976 a version dubbed into Afrikaans and titled Mirage, was shown by the SABC in South Africa.

Actors
 Jacques Santi as Michel Tanguy
 Christian Marin as Ernest Laverdure
 Michèle Girardon as Nicole
 Valéry Inkijinoff as Mr X.
 Ian Ireland as Stève Lester
 Gabriel Gascon as Louis Gagnon

Series 1

See also
 Sky Fighters, a 2005 French film with the same original comic.

External links
 
 Theme tune for the UK presentation

1960s French television series
French children's television series
Aviation television series
Military television series
Television series based on Belgian comics
Television series based on French comics